Klaus Fischer-Dieskau (Berlin, 2 January 1921 – 19 December 1994) was a German church musician and director of the Berlin Hugo-Distler Choir 1953-1989. He was the older brother of Dietrich Fischer-Dieskau.

The Hugo-Distler Chor Berlin was founded by Klaus Fischer-Dieskau in 1953 and is to be distinguished from the Hugo Distler-Chor Wien, directed by Alois Glassner, and Hugo Distler-Chor Hannover founded by Müller-Scheffsky (1952).  He also worked as a recordings producer for Deutsche Grammophon in Berlin.

Discography
 Schutz St Matthew Passion DG Archiv 1961

References

German choral conductors
German male conductors (music)
Musicians from Berlin
1921 births
1994 deaths
20th-century German conductors (music)
20th-century German male musicians
People from Steglitz-Zehlendorf
Recipients of the Order of Merit of Berlin